Rubus calycinus is a species of flowering plant in the rose family.

External links
 

calycinus